Love Is Colder Than Death can refer to:

 Love Is Colder Than Death (film), a 1969 German film
 Love Is Colder Than Death (band), a German band named after the film